Aur Ek Prem Kahani is a 1996 Indian Hindi-language film directed by Balu Mahendra. The film became features Ramesh Aravind, Sudhir Ahuja, and Heera Rajagopal. Co-starring in the film were Revathi Menon and Akshay Anand. The film is a remake of Balu Mahendra's Kannada film Kokila.

Plot
Ranganathan (Sudhir Ahuja), a middle aged engineer who lives in a middle class home in Madras with his wife Kamala (Sushma) and daughter Kokila (Heera Rajgopal), who is a medical student. Manga, (Revathy) a maid, lives with them and is treated like a member of the family. As Ranganathan travels a lot and his wife is not well, the family decides to keep a paying guest. Sathyamoorthy a bank executive (Arvind Ramesh) comes to live in the Ranganathan household. Kokila and Sathyamoorthy fall in love and plan to get married with her parents consent. Meanwhile, one night perchance Sathya and the maid Manga are alone in the house. One thing leads to another and before they realise, they end up making love. Kokila remains unaware of this incident even as Manga knows about Kokila's affair with Sathya. Sathya soon forgets the Manga episode and continues his romance with Kokila. One day while Kokila is away on a college tour, Satya is informed by Manga that she is pregnant and hopes he will not let her down. Sathya suggests that Manga abort the child. Manga is shattered and leaves the Ranganathan house. Kokila comes back from the college tour and finds Sathya missing. He has vacated the room, says her mother, and all attempts by Kokila to trace him remain futile. Kokila and Sathya meet each other accidentally, after few years in a village where she has gone as a doctor. She discovers Satya has married Manga and they have a young daughter whom they have named Kokila.

Cast
 Ramesh Aravind...  Sathyamoorthy
 Heera Rajagopal...  Kokila
 Revathi...  Manga
 Sudhir Ahuja...  Shankar
 Sushma Ahuja...  Kamla
 Akshay Anand...  Govindram Dinanath Vijaykumar Shastri

Soundtrack
Music is provided by Ilaiyaraja. He has recycled his own tunes from Johnny, Alaigal Oivathillai, Manvasanai and Olangal.

References

External links
 

1996 films
1990s Hindi-language films
Films directed by Balu Mahendra
Films scored by Ilaiyaraaja
Hindi remakes of Kannada films